Käthe Schirmacher (Danzig, 6 August 1865 – Meran, 18 November, 1930) was a German writer, journalist, and political activist who was considered to be one of the leading advocates for women's rights and the international women's movement in the 1890s.

Life
Käthe Schirmacher was the daughter of a wealthy merchant, but her family fortune was lost in the 1870s early on in her life. Schirmacher was one of the first women in Germany to earn a doctorate, studying at the Sorbonne and from Autumn of 1893 to the Spring of 1895 in Germany and earning her doctorate in Romance studies in Zürich under Heinrich Morf. Something that was unknown to the public was her homosexuality. Over the course of her life Schirmacher would have multiple partners, but her time in Zurich was spent with Margarethe Böhm.

In 1899, Schirmacher was one of the principal founders of the Association for Progressive Women's Organizations in Berlin. In 1904 she was also involved with the International Alliance of Women. During this period of time between the 1890s and the early 1900s, Schirmacher travelled around Europe and the United States and have lectures on German culture and women's issues. One of the things that Schirmacher wrote and lectured about was the idea of the "modern woman." In both her lectures and her personal writing, she expressed the necessary traits to be a modern woman; they are highlighted in Die moderne Frauenbewegung (The Modern Woman's Rights Movement, 1909).

The first was for in education and instruction, women should enjoy the same opportunities as men. The second dictated that in the field of labour, women should have the freedom to choose any occupation and to be compensated equally as any man. The third was that women should be given full legal status before the law and full civil ability. The fourth was in the social field: recognition of the value of women's work, whether in the home or in professional circles. They were extreme views for her time, but in 1904, Schirmacher pivoted to more extreme circles of political ideology and began expressing nationalist sentiments. It was the same year that Schirmacher began to break her ties with the leftist groups that she had founded, led and organised. In 1913, with the prospect of war and the wave of nationalism that was hitting Western Europe, Schirmacher broke her ties completely with the women's organisations.

At the outbreak of the World War I, Schirmacher was involved in the writing and publishing of German propaganda, mostly in the form of pamphlets, which were distributed across Germany and France.

After the war, she was involved with the right-wing German National People's Party (DNVP). She shared their nationalist and anti-Semitic views.

Published works
 The Libertad. Novella Publishing House Magazine, Zurich, 1891. 81 p. 
 The International Women's Conference in Chicago 1893. A lecture held in which the intellectuals and leaders of the International Women's Movement (IWM) gathered. Schirmacher was one of the lecturers featured. 
 Le Féminisme Aux États-Unis, En France, Dans La Grande-Bretagne, En Suède Et En Russie: Questions Du Temps Présent (1898)     
 Die Frauenbewegung, "The Women's Movement, Their Causes and Means" (1902)
 Die moderne Frauenbewegung (The Modern Woman's Rights Movement, 1909) 
 Die Suffragettes (1912)

References

External links
 
  (in English)
 Datenbank der deutschen Parlamentsabgeordneten
 Nachlassverzeichnis der Universitätsbibliothek Rostock
 FemBiografie Käthe Schirmacher von Hiltrud Schroeder mit Zitaten, Links und Literaturangaben
 Käthe Schirmacher in den Akten der Reichskanzlei

German women's rights activists
1865 births
1930 deaths
Writers from Gdańsk
German feminists
Members of the Weimar National Assembly
German National People's Party politicians
People from the Province of Prussia
German LGBT politicians
Politicians from Gdańsk
Lesbian feminists
20th-century German women politicians